Tritia incrassata, common name the thick-lipped dogwhelk, is a species of small sea snail, a marine gastropod mollusk in the family Nassariidae, the Nassa mud snails or dog whelks.

Description
The shell up to 15 mm high with rather high spire and a rounded body whorl. The protoconch is small, distinctly cyrtoconoid with 2.5 smooth whorls. The teleoconch contains 6-7 convex whorls, with a sculpture of regular spiral cords, broader than the interspaces. Its axial folds become distinctly flexuous on the body whorl. The aperture is bordered externally with a strong varix forming a rim, normally unique - not repeated at the earlier growth stages on the spire. The inner side of the outer lip bears ca. 10 denticles, elongated in the spiral direction. The parietal edge of the aperture forms a very thin, appressed callus, with a distinct adapical denticle, continued into a thicker columellar callus with a slightly raised edge. The base of the body whorl has a groove delimiting the outer part of the siphonal canal.

The colour of the shell is extremely variable, with distinct combinations of brown, black, yellowish or orange hues, most often with a paler band on abapical part of spire whorls and periphery of body whorls. Elsewhere it is arranged in bands or in spiral series of blotches, or uniform. The aperture is white with a highly diagnostic black blotch inside the siphonal canal.

Distribution
This species occurs in European waters, throughout the Mediterranean Sea and the Eastern Atlantic Ocean (from Norway to southern Morocco, also off the Canary Is. and the Azores) at depths between the shoreline to ca. 100 m.

References

 Cernohorsky W. O. (1984). Systematics of the family Nassariidae (Mollusca: Gastropoda). Bulletin of the Auckland Institute and Museum 14: 1–356.
 Backeljau, T. (1986). Lijst van de recente mariene mollusken van België [List of the recent marine molluscs of Belgium]. Koninklijk Belgisch Instituut voor Natuurwetenschappen: Brussels, Belgium. 106 pp.
 Hayward, P.J.; Ryland, J.S. (Ed.) (1990). The marine fauna of the British Isles and North-West Europe: 1. Introduction and protozoans to arthropods. Clarendon Press: Oxford, UK. . 627 pp
 Gofas, S.; Le Renard, J.; Bouchet, P. (2001). Mollusca, in: Costello, M.J. et al. (Ed.) (2001). European register of marine species: a check-list of the marine species in Europe and a bibliography of guides to their identification. Collection Patrimoines Naturels, 50: pp. 180–213 
 Ávila, S.P.; Cardigos, F.; Santos, R.S. (2004). D. João de Castro Bank, a shallow water hydrothermal-vent in the Azores: checklist of marine Molluscs. Arquipélago (Ciénc. Biol. Mar./Life Mar. Sci.) 21A: 75-80
 Muller, Y. (2004). Faune et flore du littoral du Nord, du Pas-de-Calais et de la Belgique: inventaire. [Coastal fauna and flora of the Nord, Pas-de-Calais and Belgium: inventory]. Commission Régionale de Biologie Région Nord Pas-de-Calais: France. 307 pp
 BODC (2009). Species list from the British Oceanographic Data Centre

External links
 
 Strøm H. (1768). Beskrivelse over Norske Insecter. Andet Stykke. Det Kongelige Norske Videnskabers Selskabs Skrifter, Kjobenhavn. 4: 313-371, pl. 16
  Bruguière J.G. (1789-1792). Encyclopédie méthodique ou par ordre de matières. Histoire naturelle des vers, volume 1. Paris: Pancoucke. Pp. i-xviii, 1-344
 Lamarck, (J.-B. M.) de. (1822). Histoire naturelle des animaux sans vertèbres. Tome septième. Paris: published by the Author, 711 pp.
 Montagu, G. (1803). Testacea Britannica or natural history of British shells, marine, land, and fresh-water, including the most minute: Systematically arranged and embellished with figures. J. White, London, Vol. 1, xxxvii + 291 pp;; Vol. 2, pp. 293–606, pl. 1-16
 Pennant, T. (1777). British Zoology, vol. IV. Crustacea. Mollusca. Testacea. London. i-viii, 1-154, pls. 1-93
 Payraudeau, B. C. (1826). Catalogue descriptif et méthodique des annelides et des mollusques de l'Ile de Corse; avec huit planches représentant quatre-vingt-huit espèces, dont soixante-huit nouvelles. 218 pp. Paris
 Reeve, L. A. (1853-1854). Monograph of the genus Nassa. In: Conchologia Iconica, or, illustrations of the shells of molluscous animals, vol. 9, pls 1-29 and unpaginated text. L. Reeve & Co., London.
 Drouët, H. (1858). Mollusques marins des îles Açores. Paris, Baillière. 53 pp., 2 pl
 Locard, A. (1886). Prodrome de malacologie française. Catalogue général des mollusques vivants de France. Mollusques marins. Lyon: H. Georg & Paris: Baillière. x + 778 pp
 Brusina, S. (1870). Ipsa Chiereghinii Conchylia, ovvero contribuzione pella Malacologia Adriatica desunta dal manoscritto descrizione de' Crostacei, de' Testacei, e de' Pesci che abitano le Lagune e Golfo Veneto, rappresentati in figure, a chiaro-scuro ed a colori dall Abate S. Chiereghini ... illustrata da S. Brusina. Pisa, Biblioteca Malacologica, 280 pp
 Forbes E. (1844). Report on the Mollusca and Radiata of the Aegean sea, and on their distribution, considered as bearing on geology. Reports of the British Association for the Advancement of Science for 1843. 130-193
 Risso, A. (1826-1827). Histoire naturelle des principales productions de l'Europe Méridionale et particulièrement de celles des environs de Nice et des Alpes Maritimes. Paris, F.G. Levrault. 3(XVI): 1-480, 14 pls
  Bucquoy E., Dautzenberg P. & Dollfus G. (1882-1886). Les mollusques marins du Roussillon. Tome Ier. Gastropodes. Paris: Baillière & fils. 570 pp., 66 pls. 
 Jeffreys, J. G. (1862-1869). British conchology. Vol. 1: pp. cxiv + 341 (1862). Vol. 2: pp. 479 (1864). Vol. 3: pp. 394 (1865). Vol. 4: pp. 487 (1867). Vol. 5: pp. 259 (1869). London, van Voorst.
  Galindo, L. A.; Puillandre, N.; Utge, J.; Lozouet, P.; Bouchet, P. (2016). The phylogeny and systematics of the Nassariidae revisited (Gastropoda, Buccinoidea). Molecular Phylogenetics and Evolution. 99: 337-353

incrassata
Molluscs described in 1768
Taxa named by Hans Strøm